Pyramid is an unincorporated community in Washoe County, Nevada, United States.  At one time, it was a station on the Fernley and Lassen Railway located between Bristol and Big Canyon.  There was a post office at this location from March 1904 until November 1959.

Pyramid is located north of Sutcliffe, Nevada and should not be confused with Pyramid City, located south of Sutcliffe.

See also
 List of ghost towns in Nevada

References

Ghost towns in Washoe County, Nevada